Bromus ramosus, the hairy brome, is a bunchgrass in the grass family Poaceae, native to Europe, northwest Africa and southwest Asia.<ref>Mary E. Barkworth, Laurel K. Anderton, Kathleen M. Capels, Sandy Long, Michael B. Piep (2008) Manual of Grasses for North America</ref> The name Bromus comes from the term brome, meaning oats. Unlike most other bromes (Bromus sp.), it grows in shady sites under trees.

The flower spike is gracefully arched with pendulous spikelets on long slender stems in pairs on the main stem.

SubspeciesBromus ramosus subsp. benekenii (Lange) Schintz et Thell. – lesser hairy bromeBromus ramosus subsp. ramosus''

References

External links
 
 

ramosus
Bunchgrasses of Africa
Bunchgrasses of Asia
Bunchgrasses of Europe
Flora of North Africa
Flora of Western Asia
Plants described in 1762
Taxa named by William Hudson (botanist)